CICH-FM is a community radio station that broadcasts at 93.3 FM in Chesterfield Inlet, Nunavut, Canada.

The station is owned by Chesterfield Inlet Radio Society.

External links

Ich